The title Emergency Powers Act has been included in the name of various UK laws:

Emergency Powers Act 1920
Emergency Powers Act (Northern Ireland) 1926
Emergency Powers (Defence) Act 1939
Emergency Powers (Defence) Act 1940
Emergency Powers Act 1964 Emergency Powers (Amendment) Act (Northern Ireland) 1964

and this law enacted by the Oireachtas (Irish parliament):
Emergency Powers Act 1939

See also
Emergencies Act (Canada, 1988)